is a 1977 Japanese anime fantasy film produced by Toei Animation, based on the Brothers Grimm's fairy tale The Six Swans, and on Hans Christian Andersen's variation The Wild Swans. The film was first shown in Japan on 19 March 1977 in the  Toei Manga Matsuri (Toei Cartoon Festival).

The Wild Swans represents the first entry in Toei's World Masterpiece Fairy Tales movie series, followed by Thumbelina (1978), Twelve Months (1980), Swan Lake (1981) and Aladdin and the Wonderful Lamp (1982).

Plot 

King Hildebrand is hunting in the woods when, after getting lost, he asks an old woman for help. She will lead him out only if he completes her daughter Greta's wish. Greta promises that if he marries her she will help him leave the woods. King Hildebrand accepts Greta's request and returns with her to the castle. King Hildebrand has seven children, six boys and a girl named Eliza. King Hildebrand let his children live in a castle in the woods according to his late wife's wishes. Only an enchanted ball of yarn from their mother can lead there. 

Greta steals the magic ball of yarn. The next day she goes into the woods instead of her husband. King Hildebrand's children come to greet her. When Eliza and her six brothers run to their stepmother, Greta throws cursed cloth at the six princes. They turn into swans and fly away. Eliza searches for and finds her brothers. Eliza's elder brother tells her they are able to turn human at night, but become swans when the sun rises. Eliza lives in the cave with her brothers until the arrival of spring when they have to migrate. 

Before leaving, the princes tell Eliza that to break the spell she must not speak for six years and sew six nettle cloth shirts for them. If Eliza speaks while knitting, her brothers will die. Eliza insists she must help her brothers lift the curse.

Determined to free her brothers, Eliza begins to sew the shirts with the help of her tears. When her brothers return she decides to run away, out of fear of not being able to remain silent. Eliza settles in a hollow tree where she continues sewing shirts. After six years have almost passed, she is found by King Friedrich and his hunters, who take her to court. The king is impressed by the girl and wants to marry her. 

Meanwhile Greta was expelled from the castle by King Hildebrand after he found out what she had done to his children. After a disease hits the land, Greta and her mother convince King Friedrich that Eliza is a witch who has cast a spell on the kingdom. Eliza is tried and found guilty after being caught gathering nettles in a cemetery at night. They sentence her to be burned alive. When Eliza is led to the stake she takes the shirts she had just finished sewing with her. Her brothers arrive and circle around her so she can free them from the curse. Eliza can finally speak again. She forgives her stepmother's wickedness, marries King Friedrich, and lives happily ever after.

Voice Cast

Additional Voices 

 Original: Midori Goto (後藤みどり), Noriko Kanzaki (神崎教子), Haiyuza Theater Company (俳優座), Aoni Production (青二プロダクション)
 English: Earl Hammond

Music 
The songs were composed by Akihiro Komori  and performed by Columbia Orchestra. The lyrics were written by actress Yasuko Miyazaki under the nickname Takaba, who also wrote the screenplay.

 "The Swan Princes" (白鳥の王子, Hakuchō no ōji) (Singers: Eiko Masuyama and The Chirps)
 "I'm Sorry" (なみだとねんね,  Namida to ne nen'ne) (Singers: Kumiko Ōsugi and The Chirps)

International releases 
The film was dubbed in English in 1983 by Sound Shop Inc. in New York under the direction of Peter Fernandez and released by Turner Program Services. The movie was later released on VHS in 1984 by RCA Columbia Pictures Home Video.

In Italy, the movie was theatrically released on 23 November 1978 under the title "Heidi Becomes Princess" (Italian: Heidi diventa principessa). This was done to capitalize on a vague likeness between Eliza and Heidi from Heidi, Girl of the Alps, which had gained a huge popularity in Italy that same year. Eliza's name was changed to Heidi in the movie, and Heidi's Italian child voice actress was hired to dub the character. The Italian version is a few minutes shorter, and features narration provided by the Italian narrator of the Heidi series.

The film was also dubbed in Spanish, French, German, Hungarian, Russian, Greek, Korean and Arabic.

References

External links 
 Official English webpage from Toei Animation
 
 The Wild Swans at FilmAffinity
 The Wild Swans at The Big Cartoon DataBase
 

1977 anime films
Japanese animated fantasy films
Toei Animation films
Films based on works by Hans Christian Andersen
Works based on The Wild Swans